Sings His Best Hits for Capitol Records was the twenty-second studio album of Country music artist Ronnie Milsap. It was released in 1996 under Capitol Nashville, his first for the label. The album consisted of re-recordings of past hits by Milsap including "Stranger in My House," "Smoky Mountain Rain" and "Pure Love." No singles were released.

Track listing
"Stranger in My House" (Mike Reid) - 4:13
"It Was Almost Like a Song" (Hal David, Archie Jordan) - 3:50
"Snap Your Fingers" (Grady Martin, Alex Zanetis) - 3:00
"Daydreams About Night Things" (John Schweers) - 2:24
"Smoky Mountain Rain"  (Kye Fleming, Dennis Morgan) - 3:57
"Lost in the Fifties Tonight (In the Still of the Night)" - (Fred Parris, Reid, Troy Seals)  4:32
"(There's) No Gettin' Over Me"  (Walt Aldridge, Tom Brasfield) - 3:13
"Pure Love" (Eddie Rabbitt) - 2:23
"(I'm A) Stand by My Woman Man" (Kent Robbins) - 3:04
"Button Off My Shirt"  (Billy Livsey, Graham Lyle) - 3:54

Personnel
Jamie Brantley - electric guitar, background vocals
Carol Chase - background vocals
Bruce Dees - acoustic guitar, electric guitar, background vocals
Dan Dugmore - steel guitar
Steve Gibson - acoustic guitar 
Warren Gowers - bass guitar, background vocals
Adam Hampton - keyboards, background vocals
Rhonda Hampton - background vocals
Ronnie Milsap - keyboards, lead vocals, background vocals
Cindy Richardson-Walker - background vocals
Lisa Silver - background vocals
Jay Spell - keyboards
Lonnie Wilson - drums

References
Owens, Thom. [ Sings His Best for Capitol Records], Allmusic.

1996 albums
Ronnie Milsap albums
Capitol Records albums